The Comedians is a 1941 German historical drama film directed by G. W. Pabst and starring Käthe Dorsch, Hilde Krahl and Henny Porten. It is based on the novel Philine by Olly Boeheim. The film is set in the eighteenth century, and portrays the development of German theatre. The film was shot at the Bavaria Studios in Munich with sets designed by the art director Julius von Borsody.

Plot
Karoline Neuber attempts to improve the lot of actors, who are looked down upon as vagabonds.  When the Duchess refuses to let her son marry an actress, she defends them with such vehemence that she is driven from the country and finally dies in solitude.

Cast
Käthe Dorsch as Karoline Neuber
Hilde Krahl as Philine Schröder
Henny Porten as Amalia, Duchess of Weißenfels
Gustav Diessl as Ernst Biron, Duke of  Kurland
Richard Häussler as Armin von Perckhammer
Friedrich Domin as Johann Neuber
Ludwig Schmitz as Müller, Hanswurst
Sonja Gerda Scholz as Feigin
Lucy Millowitsch as Lorenz
Bettina Moissi as Victorine
Walter Janssen as Koch, actor
Alexander Ponto as Kohlhardt, young lover
 as Count Paul, brother of Duchess of Weißenfels
 as Studiosus Gotthold
 as Professor Gottsched
Arnulf Schröder as Klupsch, Councilman of Leipzig
Karin Evans as Vera

References

External links

1940s biographical drama films
1940s historical drama films
German biographical drama films
German historical drama films
Films of Nazi Germany
German black-and-white films
Films directed by G. W. Pabst
Films based on German novels
Films set in the 18th century
Films about theatre
Bavaria Film films
Films shot at Bavaria Studios
1940s German films